Spurius is a small genus of passalid beetles from Mesoamerica.

Passalidae